Raul Arnemann (born 23 January 1953) is a retired Estonian rower who competed for the Soviet Union in the 1976 Summer Olympics.

Arnemann was born in Pärnu in 1953; it was located in the Soviet Union at that time and is today part of Estonia. In 1976 he was a crew member of the Soviet boat which won the bronze medal in the coxless four event.

References

External links
 

1953 births
Living people
Estonian male rowers
Soviet male rowers
Olympic rowers of the Soviet Union
Rowers at the 1976 Summer Olympics
Olympic bronze medalists for the Soviet Union
Olympic medalists in rowing
Sportspeople from Pärnu
World Rowing Championships medalists for the Soviet Union
Medalists at the 1976 Summer Olympics